The Layton School of Art was a post-secondary school located in Milwaukee, Wisconsin. Originally affiliated with the Layton Art Gallery, it was established by Charlotte Partridge and Miriam Frink in September 1920 in the basement of the building. It closed as a result of financial insolvency in 1974. At its closure, the school was regarded as one of the top five art schools in the United States and enjoyed a historical reputation for innovative methods in art education.

A new campus was constructed on the east side of Milwaukee in 1951 at 1362 North Prospect Avenue. This building was razed as part of the construction Park East Freeway in 1970 and the school then moved to a new location at 4650 North Port Washington Road.

Regarded as one of the most progressive art schools in the United States, Layton pioneered several movements in art education.

Notable members

Faculty
Guido Brink
John Nicholson Colt
Paul Faulkner
Paula Gerard
Knute Heldner
Joseph F. Hlavacek
Roger Ihlenfeldt
Myron Kozman
Edmund Lewandowski
Richard Lippold
Roland Poska
Karl Priebe
Walter Sheffer
 Gerrit V. Sinclair
Noel J. Spangler
Robert Strobridge
Robert Von Newmann

Alumni
 Larry Clark
 Lois Ehlert
 Rosalie Ritz
 Roy Staab
 Tom Uttech

References

Sources
  Levy, HannahHeidi. Famous Wisconsin Artists and Architects. Badger Books Inc., 2004.

Education in Milwaukee
Art schools in Wisconsin
1920 establishments in Wisconsin
1974 disestablishments in the United States